Cottonwood Township is a township in Brown County, Minnesota, United States. The population was 938 as of the 2000 census.

History
Cottonwood Township was organized in 1858. The township took its name from the Cottonwood River.

Geography
The Minnesota River flows along the township's northeast boundary; its tributaries, the Cottonwood and Little Cottonwood Rivers, also flow through the township.

The south quarter of the city of New Ulm is within the township geographically but is a separate entity.

Lake
Clear Lake

Unincorporated communities
 Searles at

Major highways
  Minnesota State Highway 15
  Minnesota State Highway 68

Adjacent townships
 Courtland Township, Nicollet County (northeast)
 Cambria Township, Blue Earth County (east)
 Linden Township (south)
 Lake Hanska Township (southwest)
 Sigel Township (west)
 Milford Township (northwest)

Cemeteries
The township includes the following cemeteries: Cottonwood, Saint Johns and Saint Josephs.

Demographics
As of the census of 2000, there were 938 people, 340 households, and 269 families residing in the township. There were 346 housing units at an average density of 9.8/sq mi (3.8/km). The racial makeup of the township was 99.04% White, 0.85% Asian, and 0.11% from two or more races. Hispanic or Latino of any race were 0.53% of the population.

There were 340 households, out of which 37.1% had children under the age of 18 living with them, 69.4% were married couples living together, 7.6% had a female householder with no husband present, and 20.6% were non-families. 17.9% of all households were made up of individuals, and 6.2% had someone living alone who was 65 years of age or older.  The average household size was 2.76 and the average family size was 3.13.

In the township the population was spread out, with 27.9% under the age of 18, 7.8% from 18 to 24, 27.9% from 25 to 44, 24.9% from 45 to 64, and 11.4% who were 65 years of age or older.  The median age was 38 years. For every 100 females, there were 108.0 males.  For every 100 females age 18 and over, there were 109.3 males.

The median income for a household in the township was $48,750, and the median income for a family was $60,000. Males had a median income of $31,726 versus $24,667 for females. The per capita income for the township was $21,299.  About 4.2% of families and 6.9% of the population were below the poverty line, including 9.7% of those under age 18 and 5.2% of those age 65 or over.

References
 United States National Atlas
 United States Census Bureau 2007 TIGER/Line Shapefiles
 United States Board on Geographic Names (GNIS)

Townships in Brown County, Minnesota
Townships in Minnesota